Aetia may refer to:

 Combretum, the bushwillows, a genus of trees and shrubs in the family Combretaceae
 Aetia, a poem by the Ancient Greek poet and scholar Callimachus